Henry Lee Man-Kee Junior (born 18 March 1958) is a Hong Kong celebrity and a racing driver.

Early life
Lee is the son of Henry Lee Hok-Ping who was a motorcycle racer and worked for Sime Darby. Lee Jr. majored in Business Administration and graduated from University of Southern California. He was an auto racing fan since young due to his father's influence. He began racing karts in 1986 and competed in the Guia Race of Macau for the first time in 1988.

Racing career

In 1999, Lee drove a Volvo S40 for Ghiasport, sponsored by Ericsson.

Lee declared bankruptcy in 2001 after suffering losses during the Asian Financial Crisis in 1997 -1999. Afterwards, all his racing activities are sponsored.

Henry Lee Jr drove for WK Longman Racing in the 2000 Asian Touring Car Series, sponsored by NuLife . After a season long battle with friend and rival Charles Kwan, he took the championship after finishing second overall in the Guia Race of Macau.

He raced again in the 2002 Hong Kong Touring Car Championship for GR Asia. He drove a Ford Focus ST170 which was sponsored by Valvoline and won the championship.

In 2005 he drove a Honda Accord for Ghiasport in the China Circuit Championship (CCC).

He was competing again in the CCC, driving a Ford Focus for Changan Ford Racing. He won the round 5 race at the Golden Port Circuit in Beijing.

In 2007, Henry Lee Junior took part in the World Touring Car Championship finale in Macau, driving a BMW 320i for Avtodom Racing. He qualified 27th  but crashed out on lap 1 in race 1.

Personal life
Lee married actress Candice Yu in 1987. They have two daughters from their marriage. Their first daughter was born in 1988 and the second daughter in 1991. Candice Yu admitted the couple have been divorced for two months in April 2003 after 16 years of marriage. In January 2008, Candice Yu claimed that she did not receive her alimony every month.

On 31 January 2008, near the age of 50, Henry Lee Junior remarried after his 26-year-old girlfriend Yu Yang had already given birth to a son for him in 2007.

Bankruptcy
Ngai Chiu-Neng was Henry Lee Junior's master in race driving, he died of liver cancer in 1996. That year, Lee invited Chui Yin-Ping, widow of Ngai Chiu-Neng, to invest HK$1.8million into his company Top Pacific Communication in 1996. But in 1998 Chui sold her shares back. In 2002, she filed for Henry Lee Junior's bankruptcy when Lee could not repay the money owed to her. The court granted an immediate bankruptcy order to Henry Lee Junior on 5 September 2002.

References

External links
 Henry Lee Junior profile by Changan Ford Racing
 Henry Lee Junior joins GR Asia for HTCC by Atnext Motor Website
 Ford announces setting up of Changan Ford Racing with Ma Hanhua and Li Wanqi (Henry Lee Junior's name in mandarin form) as official team drivers

Living people
Hong Kong racing drivers
World Touring Car Championship drivers
1958 births
24H Series drivers
Asian Touring Car Championship drivers
KCMG drivers
Chinese F4 Championship drivers